Norman Emerson (born 26 October 1939) is an Australian former cricketer. He played four first-class cricket matches for Victoria between 1960 and 1967.

See also
 List of Victoria first-class cricketers

References

External links
 

1939 births
Living people
Australian cricketers
Victoria cricketers
People from Ararat, Victoria